Thompson School may refer to:

in the United States
(by state)
 Thompson School (Webster, Massachusetts), listed on the NRHP in Worcester County, Massachusetts
Thompson Street School, New Bedford, Massachusetts, listed on the NRHP in Bristol County, Massachusetts
 Thompson School (Ethel, Mississippi), listed on the NRHP in Attala County, Mississippi

See also
Thompson House (disambiguation)